The members of the 26th General Assembly of Newfoundland were elected in the Newfoundland general election held in June 1924. The general assembly sat from 1924 to 1928.

The Liberal-Conservative Progressive Party led by Walter Stanley Monroe formed the government. Monroe resigned as prime minister in August 1928 and was succeeded by Frederick C. Alderdice.

Cyril Fox served as speaker.

Sir William Allardyce served as governor of Newfoundland.

The Liberal-Progressive Party had been formed after the collapse of the Liberal Reform government in 1924 when former Liberal Reformers joined with Albert Hickman to form a new government in the dying days of the previous General Assembly.

In April 1925, Newfoundland's Election Act was amended to grant all women over the age of 25 the right to vote; men were allowed to vote at the age of 21. Also on April 25, an act was passed that changed the distribution of seats in the House of Assembly.

Members of the Assembly 
The following members were elected to the assembly in 1924:

Notes:

By-elections 
By-elections were held to replace members for various reasons:

Notes:

References 

Terms of the General Assembly of Newfoundland and Labrador